This is a list of places in Pakistan which have standing links to local communities in other countries. In most cases, the association, especially when formalised by local government, is known as "town twinning" (usually in Europe) or "sister cities" (usually in the rest of the world).

A
Abbottabad

 Kashgar, China
 Puerto Varas, Paraguay

F
Faisalabad
 Qingdao, China

G
Gujar Khan
 Redditch, England, United Kingdom

Gwadar
 Puyang, China

H
Hyderabad
 Toledo, United States

I
Islamabad

 Amman, Jordan
 Ankara, Turkey
 Astana, Kazakhstan 
 Beijing, China
 Haikou, China
 Jakarta, Indonesia
 Minsk, Belarus
 Tianjin, China

K
Karachi

 Beirut, Lebanon
 Dhaka, Bangladesh
 Houston, United States
 İzmit, Turkey 
 Jeddah, Saudi Arabia
 Kuala Lumpur, Malaysia
 Manama, Bahrain
 Mashhad, Iran
 Port Louis, Mauritius
 Pristina, Kosovo
 Qom, Iran
 Shanghai, China
 Tashkent, Uzbekistan
 Tianjin, China
 Ürümqi, China

L
Lahore

 Bukhara, Uzbekistan
 Chengdu, China
 Chicago, United States
 Córdoba, Spain
 Dushanbe, Tajikistan
 Fez, Morocco
 Glasgow, Scotland, United Kingdom
 Haikou, China
 Hounslow, England, United Kingdom
 Isfahan, Iran
 Istanbul, Turkey
 Jining, China
 Mashhad, Iran
 Rio de Janeiro, Brazil
 Samarkand, Uzbekistan
 Sariwon, North Korea
 Xi'an, China

M
Multan

 Konya, Turkey
 Rasht, Iran

 Shihezi, China
 Xi'an, China

P
Peshawar

 Makassar, Indonesia
 Ürümqi, China

S
Sahiwal
 Rochdale, England, United Kingdom

Sialkot
 Bolingbrook, United States

Skardu
 Cortina d'Ampezzo, Italy

References

Pakistan
Lists of cities in Pakistan
Lists of populated places in Pakistan